Austrosaga spinifer is a species of insect in family Tettigoniidae. It is endemic to Australia.

References

Tettigoniidae
Orthoptera of Australia
Vulnerable fauna of Australia
Taxonomy articles created by Polbot
Insects described in 1993